David Pink (born 13 December 1939) is a British archer. He competed in the men's individual event at the 1976 Summer Olympics.

References

1939 births
Living people
British male archers
Olympic archers of Great Britain
Archers at the 1976 Summer Olympics
Sportspeople from Southend-on-Sea
20th-century British people